David Barclay may refer to:

 Col. David Barclay (Quaker) (1610–1686), 1st Laird of Urie and father of Robert Barclay, the Quaker apologist
 David Barclay of Cheapside (1682–1769), Scottish Quaker merchant, grandson of the 1st Laird of Urie, father of David Barclay of Youngsbury
 David Barclay of Youngsbury (1729–1809), English Quaker merchant and banker, grandson of Robert Barclay
 David Barclay (MP) (1784–1861), English Whig politician
 David Barclay (congressman) (1823–1889), member of the U.S. House of Representatives
 Sir David Barclay (1934–2021), British businessmen
 David E. Barclay (born 1948), American historian and author
 David Barclay (puppeteer) (born 1940), British puppeteer
 Dave O'Brien (actor) (1912–1969), who used the pseudonym David Barclay for his film writing and directing work